Albert de Gresle was a non-resident lord of the manor of Manchester.

Origins
Various antiquarians believed that the Gresle family originated from Malahulc, purported uncle of Rollo, of whom descended Roger I of Tosny, ancestor of the future Gresley Baronets. William Robert Whatton disputed this, believing the origin and descent of the Gresle family to be separate to that of the Derbyshire baronets, noting the distinct armorial bearings, and noting that there is no record of the Gresleys holding land in Lancashire. Later historians such as James Tait and Falconer Madan supported Whatton's refutation of this purported origin.

In The History of the County Palatine and Duchy of Lancaster, James Croston identifies Albert Gresle as being Albert Bussel, brother of Lord Warin Bussel of Penwortham. Tait states in Mediæval Manchester and the beginnings of Lancashire that  "this wild identification affords a good illustration of the mingled ignorance and rashness of too many local antiquaries".

Albert's surname likely originates from the Old French term greslet, meaning pock-marked or pitted. This was likely to be an attribute of either Albert himself, or one of the families earlier members. In the Domesday book, he is also known as Albert crematus (Albert the Burnt). It is difficult to tell whether this was either a previous family name, or merely a nickname.

Career
Following the Norman Conquest of England, Roger the Poitevin granted Albert with lands in Norfolk, Lincoln, Nottingham, and in conjunction with Roger de Busli the Blackburn Hundred.

Sometime after 1086, Albert resigned his fee in Blackburn, and instead obtained a grant of the manor of Manchester within the Salford Hundred.

Albert was a witness to Roger de Poitevin's charter establishing the Lancaster Priory in 1094.

References

Bibliography

External links 
Albert 6 Albert Greslet (aka Crematus), fl. 1086, pase.domesday.ac.uk

Lords of the manor of Manchester